Paul McFadden (born 14 September 1965) is a Scottish retired professional footballer. Active in both Scotland and Australia, McFadden played as a midfielder.

Career
Born in Glasgow, McFadden began his career in the youth team of Duntocher. He played in Scotland for Motherwell, making 23 league appearances between 1983 and 1986. He later played in Australia for Melita Eagles, Sutherland Sharks, Wollongong City and A.P.I.A. Leichhardt Tigers.

References

1965 births
Living people
Footballers from Glasgow
Association football midfielders
Scottish footballers
Scottish expatriate footballers
Expatriate soccer players in Australia
Scottish Football League players
National Soccer League (Australia) players
APIA Leichhardt FC players
Wollongong Wolves FC players
Motherwell F.C. players
Parramatta FC players
Scottish expatriate sportspeople in Australia